Orville H. Platt High School, commonly called Platt High School, is a public high school located in Meriden, Connecticut.

History 
In the late 1950s, Meriden High School suffered from overcrowding. Two high schools were built in Meriden to relieve the overcrowding: Orville H. Platt High School and Francis T. Maloney High School. Platt first opened in September, 1958. The school was expanded in September 1970; additions included more classrooms, a graphics art department, library space, cafeteria space, a second gymnasium, and a swimming pool. Starting in October 2013, the school underwent massive renovation, finishing fall 2017. These renovations included the addition of a new wing containing, among other things, a freshman academy and a vocational technology facility.

References

External links
 

1958 establishments in Connecticut
Public high schools in Connecticut
Schools in New Haven County, Connecticut